Crescent Bar is a resort area and census-designated place (CDP) in Grant County, Washington, United States. As of the 2020 census, it had a population of 325.

The CDP is on the western edge of the county, on the east side of the Columbia River. A portion of the community occupies an island (Crescent Bar) in the river. SR 28 leads east  to Quincy and northwest  to Wenatchee.

References

External links
 Crescent Bar Recreation Area

Populated places in Grant County, Washington
Census-designated places in Grant County, Washington
Census-designated places in Washington (state)